New Caledonia Super Ligue is the top division of the Fédération Calédonienne de Football in New Caledonia. It is played as a double round robin between the top-4 clubs from the Division Honneur of Grande Terre and the champions of the Îles.

Previous winners
Champions so far are:

1950: Impassible
1951: Impassible
1952: Indépendante
1953: Impassible
1954: Indépendante
1955:  unknown
1956: Impassible
1957: PLGC
1958: PLGC
1959: PLGC
1960: Impassible
1961:  unknown
1962: USC Nouméa
1963: USC Nouméa
1964–77: unknown
1978: Gélima Canala bt AS Lössi (Nouméa)
1979–83: unknown
1984: AS Frégate (Mont-Dore) 3–0 AS Païta
1985: AS Kunié 1–1 CA Saint-Louis (3–2, pens)
1986–92: unknown
1993: Wé Luécilla bt AS Magenta Le Nickel
1994: JS Baco (Koné) bt AS Magenta Le Nickel
1995: JS Baco (Koné) bt JS Traput (Lifou)
1996: JS Traput (Lifou) bt JS Baco (Koné)
1997: JS Baco (Koné) 2–1 CA Saint-Louis
1998: AS Poum 4–2 JS Traput (Lifou)
1999: Gaïtcha FCN (Nouméa) 2–2 AS Auteuil (Nouméa) (4–3, pens)
2000: JS Baco (Koné) 1–0 JS Traput (Lifou)
2001: JS Baco (Koné) 1–0 AS Mont-Dore
2002: AS Mont-Dore 2–2 JS Baco (Koné) (4–3, pens)
2002–03: AS Magenta (Nouméa) 5–3 JS Baco (Koné) (aet)
2003–04: AS Magenta (Nouméa) 3–1 AS Mont-Dore
2004–05: AS Magenta (Nouméa) 3–2 AS Mont-Dore
2005–06: AS Mont-Dore
2006–07: JS Baco (Koné) bt AS Lössi (Nouméa)
2007–08: AS Magenta (Nouméa) bt AS Mont-Dore
2008–09: AS Magenta (Nouméa) bt AS Mont-Dore
2009: AS Magenta (Nouméa) bt Hienghène Sport
2010: AS Mont-Dore bt AS Magenta (Nouméa)
2011: AS Mont-Dore
2012: AS Magenta
2013: Gaïtcha FCN
2014: AS Magenta
2015: AS Magenta
2016: AS Magenta
2017: Hienghène Sport
2018: AS Magenta
2019: Hienghène Sport
2020: AS Tiga Sport
2021: Hienghène Sport
2022: AS Tiga Sport

Top scorers

References

External links
League at FIFA
League at soccerway.com

 
Top level football leagues in Oceania
Football leagues in Overseas France